Glyptholaspis is a genus of mites in the family Macrochelidae. There is one described species in Glyptholaspis, G. fimicola.

References

Macrochelidae
Articles created by Qbugbot